The William Alanson White Institute (WAWI), founded in 1943, is an institution for training psychoanalysts and psychotherapists which also offers general psychotherapy and psychoanalysis. It is located in New York City, United States, on the Upper West Side, in the Clara Thompson building. It was founded as a protest against the mainstream of American psychoanalytic thought, which was thought to be sterile, dogmatic, and constrictive by the psychoanalysts who founded the institute. WAWI differs from mainstream psychoanalysis through their interpersonal approach to therapy, where the therapist takes an active interest in the patient's life and becomes invested in their wellbeing. WAWI also offers continuing education, through conferences, lectures, and symposia, and publishes the journal Contemporary Psychoanalysis

Background
William Alanson White was an American psychiatrist who became superintendent of the "Government Hospital for the Insane", later named St. Elizabeths Hospital, in Washington, D.C. He was known for humanizing the treatment of the mentally ill, doing away with restraints, and offering occupational therapy to patients. The founders of WAWI are Erich Fromm and Clara Thompson, joined by Harry Stack Sullivan, Frieda Fromm-Reichmann, David Rioch and Janet Rioch.

WAWI takes an unashamedly progressive political stance on many issues. It emphasizes psychoanalytic activism in relation to issues of importance in culture and society, and addresses problems of living which are considered to be beyond the scope of classical psychoanalysis.  WAWI is strongly influenced by the work of Sándor Ferenczi, a member of Freud's inner circle who pioneered the analyst's authentic use of himself in the consulting room, emphasizing the mutuality of the relationship between therapist and client.

Achievements
In 2001, the American Psychoanalytic Association presented its first Psychoanalytic Community Clinic of the Year Award to the Clinical Service of the William Alanson White Institute. WAWI publishes the journal Contemporary Psychoanalysis. The journal reports advances in the application of psychotherapy and psychoanalysis to depression, personality disorders, conflicts about sex and gender, and other psychological problems.

See also
William Alanson White
Contemporary Psychoanalysis

References

External links
The William Alanson White Institute website

Psychology institutes
1946 establishments in New York (state)
Psychoanalysis in the United States
Psychology organizations based in the United States
Mental health organizations in New York (state)